Davis Young Paschall (October 2, 1911 – October 25, 2001) was the twenty second president of the College of William & Mary, serving from 1960 to 1971.  Prior to that, he served as Superintendent of Public Instruction for the Commonwealth of Virginia from 1957 to 1960, during the state-decreed period of Massive Resistance. During his superintendency public schools in the state were closed by gubernatorial and legislative fiat and subsequently, Dr. Paschall took steps to reopen those schools during the federal requirements.
His papers from his time as president of the College of William & Mary can be found in the Special Collections Research Center at the College of William & Mary.

Death
On the 25 October 2001, 23 days after his 90th birthday, Paschall died from natural causes.

References

External links
Finding aid for the Davis Young Paschall Collection
Finding aid for Office of the President. Davis Young Paschall
SCRC Wiki page for Davis Young Paschall

2001 deaths
Presidents of the College of William & Mary
College of William & Mary alumni
State cabinet secretaries of Virginia
1911 births
20th-century American politicians